Sahadharmini is a 1967 Indian Malayalam film directed and produced by P. A. Thomas. The film stars Sathyan, Kaviyoor Ponnamma, Adoor Bhasi and Hari in the lead roles. The film had musical score by B. A. Chidambaranath.

Cast
Sathyan
Kaviyoor Ponnamma
Adoor Bhasi
Hari
Muthukulam Raghavan Pillai
O. Ramdas
T. R. Omana
Shaji
Pankajavalli
Ushakumari

Soundtrack
The music was composed by B. A. Chidambaranath and the lyrics were written by Vayalar Ramavarma.

References

External links
 

1967 films
1960s Malayalam-language films
Films directed by P. A. Thomas